Guerrilla Girl is a documentary film directed by Frank Piasechi Poulsen. It tells the story of a young girl named Isabel, who enters the Revolutionary Armed Forces of Colombia, the largest Marxist–Leninist revolutionary guerrilla organization in South America.

External links 
 

Danish documentary films
Documentary films about revolutionaries
2005 documentary films
2000s Spanish-language films
2005 films